Rhynchodoras xingui is a species of thorny catfish endemic to Brazil where it is found in the upper Xingu River basin.  This species grows to a length of  SL.

References 
 

Doradidae
Fish of South America
Fish of Brazil
Endemic fauna of Brazil
Taxa named by Wolfgang Klausewitz
Fish described in 1961